Steven Warner is a visual effects supervisor. He is best known for his work on blockbuster feature film projects such as Saving Private Ryan (1998), Gladiator (2000), Defiance (2008), and The Martian (2015). 

In 2016, Steven Warner was nominated at the 88th Academy Awards for his work on the film The Martian  in the category for Best Visual Effects. His nomination was shared with Anders Langlands, Chris Lawrence, and Richard Stammers.

Awards and nominations
 
 2016: Academy Award for Best Visual Effects for The Martian 
 2016: BAFTA Award for Best Special Visual Effects for The Martian 
 2016: SFC Award for Best Visual Effects for The Martian 
 2009: VES Award for Outstanding Special Effects in a Feature Motion for Defiance

References

External links

Living people
Special effects people
Year of birth missing (living people)
Place of birth missing (living people)